George Arnold may refer to:

 George Arnold (poet) (1834–1865), American author and poet
 George Arnold (bishop) (1914–1998), Canadian Anglican bishop
 George Arnold (entomologist) (1881–1962), British entomologist
 George Benjamin Arnold (1832–1902), English organist and musical composer
 George H. Arnold (1838–1883), New York politician
 George Matthews Arnold (1826–1908), English solicitor and politician, Mayor of Gravesend and Alderman of Kent County Council
 George William Arnold (fl. 2010s), engineer

See also
 George Arnald (1763–1841), British painter